Yannick Lefèbvre (born 19 November 1988) is a Belgian sailor. He and Tom Pelsmaekers placed 17th in the 49er event at the 2016 Summer Olympics.

References

1988 births
Living people
Belgian male sailors (sport)
Olympic sailors of Belgium
Sailors at the 2016 Summer Olympics – 49er